The following is a listing of every United Productions of America (UPA) short released through Columbia Pictures from 1948 to 1959, as well as a complete feature film list and an incomplete list of TV series, industrial films and training films.

Theatrical filmography

Shorts

1948 
 Robin Hoodlum – Academy Award Nominee

1949 
 The Magic Fluke – Academy Award Nominee
 The Ragtime Bear

1950 
 Punchy DeLeon
 Spellbound Hound
 The Miner's Daughter
 Giddyap
 Trouble Indemnity – Academy Award Nominee
 The Popcorn Story
 Bungled Bungalow
 Gerald McBoing-Boing – Academy Award Winner

1951 
 The Family Circus
 Barefaced Flatfoot
 Georgie and the Dragon
 Fuddy Duddy Buddy
 Peter Cottontail
 Wonder Gloves
 Grizzly Golfer
 Rooty Toot Toot – Academy Award Nominee

1952 
 The Oompahs
 Sloppy Jalopy
 The Dog Snatcher
 Willie the Kid
 Pink and Blue Blues – Academy Award Nominee
 Pete Hothead
 Hotsy Footsy
 Madeline – Academy Award Nominee
 Captains Outrageous

1953 
 It's Time for Everybody – Created as promotional film for the CBS Radio Network.
 Little Boy with a Big Horn
 The Emperor's New Clothes
 Safety Spin
 Christopher Crumpet – Academy Award Nominee
 Gerald McBoing-Boing's Symphony
 Magoo's Masterpiece
 The Unicorn in the Garden
 Magoo Slept Here
 The Tell-Tale Heart – Academy Award Nominee

1954 
 Bringing Up Mother
 Ballet-Oop
 Magoo Goes Skiing (Submitted and screened at the 26th Academy Awards for an Oscar consideration, but wasn't nominated)
 The Man on the Flying Trapeze
 Fudget's Budget
 Kangaroo Courting
 How Now Boing Boing
 Destination Magoo
 Frosty the Snowman
 When Magoo Flew – Academy Award Winner

1955 
 Spare the Child
 Four Wheels and No Brake
 Magoo's Check-Up
 Baby Boogie
 Magoo's Express
 Madcap Magoo
 Christopher Crumpet's Playmate
 Stage Door Magoo
 Rise of Duton Lang
 Magoo Makes News (Submitted and screened at the 28th Academy Awards for an Oscar consideration, but wasn't nominated)

1956 
 Gerald McBoing! Boing! on Planet Moo – Academy Award Nominee
 Magoo's Canine Mutiny
 Magoo Goes West
 Calling Dr. Magoo
 The Jaywalker – Academy Award Nominee
 Magoo Beats the Heat
 Magoo's Puddle Jumper – Academy Award Winner
 Trailblazer Magoo
 Magoo's Problem Child
 Meet Mother Magoo

1957 
 Magoo Goes Overboard
 Matador Magoo
 Magoo Breaks Par
 Magoo's Glorious Fourth
 Magoo's Masquerade
 Magoo Saves the Bank
 Rockhound Magoo
 Magoo's Moose Hunt
 Magoo's Private War (Submitted and screened at the 30th Academy Awards for an Oscar consideration, but wasn't nominated)
 Trees and Jamaica Daddy – Academy Award Nominee

1958 
 Sailing and the Village Band (Submitted and screened at the 31st Academy Awards for an Oscar consideration, but wasn't nominated)
 Magoo's Young Manhood
 Scoutmaster Magoo
 The Explosive Mr. Magoo
 Magoo's Three-Point Landing (Submitted and screened at the 31st Academy Awards for an Oscar consideration, but wasn't nominated)
 Magoo's Cruise
 Love Comes to Magoo
 Spring and Saganaki
 Gumshoe Magoo

1959 
 Bwana Magoo
 Picnics Are Fun and Dino's Serenade (Submitted and screened at the 32nd Academy Awards for an Oscar consideration, but wasn't nominated)
 Bric’s Stew (not released)
 Magoo's Homecoming
 Merry Minstrel Magoo
 Magoo's Lodge Brother
 Terror Faces Magoo
 Magoo Meets Boing Boing (The Noise-Making Boy) (Later released on the TV series Mister Magoo retitled "Magoo Meets McBoing Boing", Submitted and screened at the 32nd Academy Awards for an Oscar consideration, but wasn't nominated)

1960 
 Magoo Meets Frankenstein (Later released on the TV series Mister Magoo)
 I Was a Teenage Magoo (Later released on the TV series Mister Magoo retitled "Teenage Magoo", Submitted and screened at the 33rd Academy Awards for an Oscar consideration, but wasn't nominated)

Features 
Produced
 1001 Arabian Nights (1959) (released by Columbia Pictures)
 Gay Purr-ee (1962) (released by Warner Bros.)

Other
 No Minor Vices (1948) (animated sequence)
 The Red Pony (1949) (special effects)
 Dreamboat (1952) (animation)
 The Four Poster (1952) (animation)
 The Girl Next Door (1953) (animation)
 The Vikings (1958) (title sequence)
 What's Up, Tiger Lily? (1966) (title sequence)

Television filmography

Television series 
 The Roy Rogers Show (1951–1957)
 The Gerald McBoing-Boing Show (1956–1957)
 The Garry Moore Show (1958) (animation)
 The Twilight Zone (1959) (main titles)
 Mister Magoo (1960–1961)
 The Dick Tracy Show (1961–1962)
 The Famous Adventures of Mr. Magoo (1964–1965)
 What's New Mr. Magoo? (1977–1979) (licensed and co-produced by DePatie-Freleng Enterprises)

Specials 
 Our Mr. Sun (1956) (animation)
 Mr. Magoo's Christmas Carol (1962)
 Uncle Sam Magoo (1970)

Miscellaneous filmography 
1943:
 Sparks and Chips Get the Blitz

1944:
 Hell-Bent for Election
 A Few Quick Facts about Inflation
 Lend Lease

1945:
 A Few Quick Facts about Fear
 A Few Quick Facts about Japan 
 Brotherhood of Man
 Fuel Tank Selection
 Join-Up Collisions
 Take-Off Accidents

1946:
 Flat Hatting
 Idling Mixture Check
 In Your Power
 Check and Double Check
 Disorientation Crashes
 Collisions with the Earth
 Taxiing Collisions
 After the Cut
 Expanding World Relationships

1947:
 Landing Accidents
 Emergency Landings on Land
 Marginal Weather Accidents
 Accident Injury Prevention
 Three Unions
 How a Bill Goes through Congress

1948:
 Swab Your Choppers
 Accidents Resulting from Unfamiliarity in Aircraft; or, The Rover Boys in Peril
 Inside Morgan's Head

1949:
 Hazards in Ground Operation in Jet Aircraft
 Jet Wings for Tomorrow
 Bailing Out
 The Sailor and the Seagull
 Collisions during Simulated Combat
 Dusty of the Circus (TV pilot)
Big Tim

1951:
 Discipline Pays Off
 Man On The Land

1952:
 Man Alive!
 More Than Meets the Eye

1953
 Howdy Doody and His Magic Hat 

1954:
 Pump Trouble 

1955:
 Hooray for Homer

1956:
 Sappy Homiens

1959:
 Inside Magoo

1961
Mr. Digit and the Battle of Bubbling Brook
AT&T instructional video on conversion from lettered telephone exchanges to all-numeric dialing, which mixed live action and animation, featuring Peg Lynch and Alan Bunce as their TV and radio characters, Ethel and Albert, and an uncredited Howard McNear as the animated Mr. Digit. In the end credits, it was shown that UPA's phone number was 213-TH2-7171. When Mr. Digit spotted that, he summoned numbers that knocked the letters out of the number so it read 213-842-7171. (Due to subsequent area code splits, had UPA kept its phone number, it would be 323-842-7171 today) 

1976:
 Dimensions of Quality

References 
Notes

Sources 
 whenmagooflew

UPA cartoons
UPA (animation studio)